The Peruvian district of Puente Piedra is one of the 43 districts in the Lima Province.

History 
The district was founded on February 14, 1927 by Law Nº 5675.

Geography 
It has an area of 71.18 square kilometers and a population of more than 200,000.

Boundaries
North: Ancón District
East: Carabayllo District
South: Comas District, Los Olivos District, San Martín de Porres District
West: Ventanilla District, Mi Peru District

See also 
 Administrative divisions of Peru

References

Districts of Lima
States and territories established in 1927
1927 establishments in Peru